Bradford Steven "Steve" Ellington (July 26, 1941, Atlanta - March 22, 2013, Montgomery, Alabama) was an American jazz drummer.

Ellington picked up drums when he was four years old and played with Ray Charles when he was nine. In the latter half of the 1950s he played with Charles Brown, George Adams, and Duke Pearson. He studied for one year at the New England Conservatory of Music in 1961–1962, where he played with Sam Rivers, then worked with June Christy, Joe Castro, and Hampton Hawes. He began playing with Roland Kirk in 1964, with whom he would perform and record through 1970; aside from Kirk, he played as a sideman himself with Jackie McLean, Chet Baker, Stanley Turrentine, and Mose Allison. Concomitantly, he led his own band in 1965–1966, whose sidemen were Woody Shaw, Walter Davis, Jr., Wilbur Ware, and C. Sharpe.

In the 1970s Ellington worked with Billy Eckstine, Brick Jazz Funk Fusion, Hampton Hawes, Art Farmer, Freddy Cole, Freddie Hubbard, Ike Isaacs, Maxine Sullivan, Harry "Sweets" Edison, Eddie "Lockjaw" Davis, and Dan Wall. He returned to work with Rivers in the period 1980–1982, played with Sonny Stitt and Dave Holland, then put together a new ensemble of his own, which was active from 1985 to 1990. He was the drummer for Michel Petrucciani's trio from 1988 to 1990, and in the 1990s worked with Hal Galper, Steve Grossman, James Moody, and Johnny Griffin.

References
Rick Mattingly, "Steve Ellington". The New Grove Dictionary of Jazz. 2nd edition, ed. Barry Kernfeld, 2004.

American jazz drummers
Musicians from Georgia (U.S. state)
1941 births
2013 deaths